Il pomo d'oro (The Golden Apple) is an opera in a prologue and five acts by the Italian composer Antonio Cesti with a libretto by Francesco Sbarra (1611-1668). It was first performed before the imperial court in a specially constructed open-air theatre Vienna in 1668. The work was so long it had to be staged over the course of two days: the Prologue, Acts One and Two were given on July 12; Acts Three, Four and Five on July 14. Originally planned to mark the wedding of the Habsburg Holy Roman Emperor Leopold I and Margaret Theresa of Spain in 1666, the production was rescheduled to mark the Empress's 17th birthday in 1668. The staging was unprecedented for its magnificence (and expense). The designer Ludovico Ottavio Burnacini provided no fewer than 24 sets and there were plenty of opportunities for spectacular stage machinery, including shipwrecks and collapsing towers.

Roles

Synopsis
The opera tells the story of the Judgement of Paris. The gods ask the Trojan prince Paris to decide which of the goddesses Venus, Juno and Pallas (Minerva) is the most beautiful and thus deserving of the Golden Apple of Discord. Paris gives the prize to Venus. The spurned goddesses try to get their revenge until Jupiter decides to end the confusion, turns to the audience and awards the golden apple to the Empress Margaret Theresa.

Sources
The Viking Opera Guide ed. Holden (Viking, 1993)
Del Teatro (in Italian)
Le magazine de l'opéra baroque
The Oxford Illustrated History of Opera ed. Parker (OUP, 1994)

Italian-language operas
Operas by Antonio Cesti
1668 operas
Operas